The 61st Infantry Division (61-ya Pekhotnaya Diviziya) was an infantry formation of the Russian Imperial Army.

Organization
1st Brigade
241st Infantry Regiment
242nd Infantry Regiment
2nd Brigade
243rd Infantry Regiment
244th Infantry Regiment

Rank insignia

Officer ranks

Non-commissioned officers and enlisted ranks

References

Infantry divisions of the Russian Empire